Company Path Garden is a small garden on the west side of the Avenue of the Republic in Georgetown, Guyana, between Church and North Streets. During colonial times, “company path” was the name given to a road used by the propertied class as an access road from the river  to their lands. The company path, in this case, extended from the side of the Demerara River along the path on which the Bank of Guyana was built and eastwards beyond the Avenue of the Republic.

In 1907, the entrance to the St. George's Cathedral, combined with the Company Path, was transferred to the Georgetown Town Council by the Government. It was turned into a garden the next year.

Non-aligned Monument

The Non-aligned Monument was placed in the garden during the 1972 Non-Aligned Foreign Ministers Conference in Georgetown. The monument contains the busts of Presidents Gamal Abdel Nasser (Egypt), Kwame Nkrumah (Ghana), Jawaharlal Nehru (India), and Josip Broz Tito (Yugoslavia) who founded the Non-Aligned Movement for states that are not formally aligned with the major powers.

The monument was revealed by President Arthur Chung. The busts were sculpted in the countries of origin, and have been complemented by four quartz stones from the Orinduik Falls. The Non-aligned Monument is one of the nine national monuments of Guyana.

References

External links 

 Non-aligned monument at the National Trust of Guyana

History of Guyana
Georgetown, Guyana
Gardens in Guyana